Cangqian Campus Hangzhou Normal University is a metro station on Line 5 of the Hangzhou Metro in China. It is located in the Yuhang District of Hangzhou and it serves the Cangqian Campus of Hangzhou Normal University.

References

Railway stations in Zhejiang
Railway stations in China opened in 2019
Hangzhou Metro stations